Akkad Sport Club, is an Iraqi football team based in Al-Shatrah, Dhi Qar, that plays in Iraq Division one.

Managerial history

  Abdul-Amir Aziz
  Azhar Tahir 
  Bassim Obaid

See also 
 2021–22 Iraq Division Two

References

External links
 Akkad SC on Goalzz.com

2003 establishments in Iraq
Association football clubs established in 2003
Football clubs in Dhi Qar